The 1950 Mississippi State Maroons football team was an American football team that represented  Mississippi State College as a member of the Southeastern Conference (SEC) during the 1950 college football season. In their second year under head coach Arthur Morton, the team compiled an overall record of 4–5, with a mark of 3–4 in conference play, placing seventh in the SEC.

Schedule

References

Mississippi State
Mississippi State Bulldogs football seasons
Mississippi State Maroons football